Jacob David Bender  (born April 25, 1985) is a former American football guard and offensive tackle. He was drafted by the New York Jets in the sixth round in the 2007 NFL Draft. He played college football at Nicholls State University.

Bender was also a member of the New England Patriots, San Francisco 49ers, New York Giants, New Orleans Saints, Hartford Colonials, Washington Redskins, Carolina Panthers and York Capitals.

Early years
Bender played high school football under Bill McGregor at the prestigious DeMatha Catholic High School in Hyattsville.

College career
In 2004 Bender took over as the starting left tackle at Nicholls State, started every game during his career and became an All-Southland Conference selection. In the 2005 season Bender started every game and became an All-Southland Conference first-team and All-Louisiana second-team selection after allowing only 1.5 sacks, 76 pancake blocks, and 8 touchdown resulting blocks. In his final season of 2006, Bender was once again named to the All-Southland Conference and All-Louisiana teams after recording 87 pancake blocks, 8 touchdown resulting blocks and 0 sacks allowed.

Professional career

New York Jets
Bender was drafted by the Jets in the sixth round of the 2007 NFL Draft. He was active for two games for the Jets in the 2007 season, and was waived by the team on August 30, 2008.

New England Patriots
Bender was signed to the practice squad of the New England Patriots on September 1, 2008. He remained there until he was signed by the San Francisco 49ers on November 18.

San Francisco 49ers
Bender was signed by the San Francisco 49ers off the New England Patriots' practice squad on November 18, 2008 when offensive tackle Jonas Jennings was placed on injured reserve.

New York Giants
After being cut by the 49ers on September 5, 2009, Bender was signed to the New York Giants practice squad on September 16. On January 5, 2010 Bender was signed to a reserved/future contract. On September 4, 2010, Bender was waived by the Giants.

New Orleans Saints
Bender was signed to the New Orleans Saints practice squad on September 13, 2010.

Washington Redskins
Bender was signed to the Washington Redskins practice squad on November 23, 2010.

Carolina Panthers
On December 29, 2010, Bender was signed by the Panthers to their practice squad. His contract was extended on January 14, 2011. He was cut on September 3, 2011.

York Capitals
Bender started playing for the York Capitals of American Indoor Football in 2014.

References

Nicholls State Colonels media guide

External links
 Nicholls State bio
 New England Patriots bio
 NFL bio

1985 births
Living people
People from Anne Arundel County, Maryland
Players of American football from Maryland
American football offensive tackles
American football offensive guards
Nicholls Colonels football players
New York Jets players
New England Patriots players
San Francisco 49ers players
New York Giants players
New Orleans Saints players
Hartford Colonials players
Carolina Panthers players
People from Hyattsville, Maryland
Central Penn Capitals players